Palli Chandai is a small village near Keeladi the famous archeological site of Tamil Nadu on the border of Madurai and Sivaganga districts. The grave of Saalaar Shah Shaheed who was a soldier in the army of Qutb Sulthan Syed Ibrahim Shaheed of Erwadi and Sulthan Sikandhar Badusha of Thiruparankundram in Madurai is located here. The anniversary Urus festival of this dargah is commemorated in the Islamic month of Safar. The mosque and dargah are renovated by local Muslims.

Villages in Madurai district
Dargahs in India
Sufi shrines in India
Ziyarat
Tourist attractions in Madurai
Islam in Tamil Nadu
Dargahs in Tamil Nadu
Erwadi-related dargahs